Sahar Delijani (born 1983) is an Iranian author. Her debut novel, Children of the Jacaranda Tree,
has been published in more than 75 countries and translated into 30 languages.

Life 

Sahar Delijani was born in Evin Prison in Tehran while both her parents were detained as leftist political activists, fighting against the newly established Islamic regime. Delijani's mother spent two years and a half in prison and her father four years. Her uncle, her father's younger brother, however, was among thousands of political prisoners executed and buried in mass graves by the regime in 1988.

Delijani, her older brother and her cousin were raised by her grandparents and aunt  until their parents' release. Much of this experience, inside and outside Evin Prison, serves as an inspiration for Delijani's debut novel, which spans the decades from 1983 to 2011 and the Iranian Green Movement, when young Iranians once again take to the streets, set to make their own history.

In 1996, at the age of 12, Delijani and her family moved to Northern California. In 2002, she attended University of California, Berkeley, earning a BA degree in Comparative Literature. Graduating in 2006, she moved to Turin, Italy where she lived for over 10 years. She has moved back to California where she is working on her second novel.

Twice a Pushcart nominee and longlisted for the Granum Foundation Prize and Le Livre de Poche Prix des Lecteurs, Delijani's writing has appeared in several literary magazines and newspapers including Literary Hub, Kweli Journal, BBC Persian, The Bellevue Review, Slice Magazine, DW Persian, Corriere della Sera and La Nazione.

Selected Works/Publications

Recognition and reception 

Children of the Jacaranda Tree came to immediate international attention well before its publication at the 2012 London Book Fair as a multi country simultaneous auction started among different publishers, selling North American rights to Atria Publishing/Simon & Schuster; U.K. rights to Weidenfeld & Nicolson/Orion Publishing Group; and Italian rights to Rizzoli. The novel was released in June 2013 to positive reviews and was furthermore hailed by Khaled Hosseini, author of The Kite Runner, who calls it "a celebration of the human heart's eternal yearning for freedom" and names it as one of his recommended books in the March 2013 newsletter of The Khaled Hosseini Foundation. Children of the Jacaranda Tree was among Kansas City Star's Top books of 2013. In December 2012, Delijani was heralded by the Italian national newspaper, La Stampa, as one of the literary protagonists of 2013.

Children of the Jacaranda Tree was a finalist for Elle's Gran Premio 2014, a Women's National Book Association's Great Group Read 2014 selection. CBS Local Best Book Club Picks for Fall 2014 and a candidate for Prix des Lecteurs Sélection 2015 by Le Livre de Poche.

References

External links 
 Official website
 Author Sahar Delijani's biography
 Sahar Delijani's Children of the Jacaranda Tree Book Review
 Sahar Delijani's Profile at Victoria Sanders and Associates
 Sahar Delijani's Interview with BookBrowse.com
 Articles by Sahar Delijani
 phttps://www.thriftbooks.com/a/sahar-delijani/352733/ Books by Sahar Delijani, Thriftbooks]

1983 births
Living people
Iranian women novelists
Iranian novelists
Iranian women writers
Iranian writers
University of California, Berkeley people
21st-century American novelists
American women novelists
21st-century American women writers
Iranian refugees
Iranian emigrants to the United States
Writers from Tehran